Kim Gyu-ri (born Kim Min-sun on 16 August 1979), is a South Korean actress best known for the film Portrait of a Beauty.

Biography 

She was involved in a controversy in 2008 when she made a statement against eating beef imported from the United States; this led to a lawsuit by a beef importer in Seoul but the courts ruled in her favor in 2010. She also spoke out in behalf of entertainers' invasion of privacy regarding the explosive "Entertainment X-file" issue in 2005. In 2009 she officially changed her name from Kim Min-sun to Kim Gyu-ri. She dated Kim Joo-hyuk, her co-star in period drama God of War, from 2012 to 2013.

Filmography

Film

Television series

Variety show

Hosting

Music video

Books

Awards and nominations

References

External links 
 Official profile

1979 births
Living people
People from Anyang, Gyeonggi
MBK Entertainment artists
South Korean film actresses
South Korean television actresses
South Korean Buddhists
20th-century South Korean actresses
21st-century South Korean actresses